Melagne Lath (born September 2, 1963) is an Ivorian sprint canoer who competed in the mid to late 1980s. At the 1984 Summer Olympics in Los Angeles, he was eliminated in the repechages of the K-2 500 m event. Four years later in Seoul, Lath was eliminated in the repechages of the same event.

External links
Sports-Reference.com profile

1963 births
Canoeists at the 1984 Summer Olympics
Canoeists at the 1988 Summer Olympics
Ivorian male canoeists
Living people
Olympic canoeists of Ivory Coast